Eucalyptus cyclostoma is a species of mallee that is endemic to an area in the south of Western Australia. It has smooth, greyish bark, lance-shaped adult leaves, flower buds in groups of between seven and eleven, white flowers and more or less spherical fruit.

Description
It has whitish-grey-cream, brown and pinkish grey coloured bark that is flaky to ribbony can be rough or smooth. It blooms between February and April and produces white flowers. Mature buds are cylindrical to pear-shaped with a beaked operculum with inflexed stamens and oblong anthers. The fruit has three or four valves at about the level of the rim.

Taxonomy
The species was first formally described by the botanist Ian Brooker in 1981 in the journal Brunonia from a specimen he collected west of Balladonia in 1970. The specific epithet (cyclostoma) is derived from the Ancient Greek words kyklos meaning "circle" or "ring" and stoma meaning "mouth" in reference to the marked rim of the fruit.

Eucalyptus cyclostoma is part of the subgenus Symphyomyrtus section Dumaria in a sub-group of nine closely related species in the series Ovulares. The other members of this series include the smooth barked E. cylindrocarpa, E. exigua and E. oraria, and the rough barked E. ovularis, E. aequioperta, E. brachycorys, E. myriadena and E. baudiniana.

Distribution
This eucalypt is found on limestone plains on the south western Goldfields-Esperance region of Western Australia growing in sandy loam or red sand soils. It has a limited range around Balladonia and Zanthus where it forms part of low woodland communities.

See also
List of Eucalyptus species

References

cyclostoma
Endemic flora of Western Australia
Mallees (habit)
Myrtales of Australia
Eucalypts of Western Australia
Plants described in 1981
Taxa named by Ian Brooker